The Common Good is a small Christian political party in the United Kingdom. Founded and led by Richard (Dick) Rodgers, a clergyman, motorcyclist and orthopaedic registrar living in Northfield, Birmingham, the party's principles are based on his Christian faith.

Rodgers has competed in several elections for Common Good, including various parliamentary by-elections. In all cases Common Good have lost their deposit. No one else has been an election candidate for the party.

In 2016, the party campaigned for the United Kingdom to remain in the European Union during the referendum.

Electoral history
Parliamentary election

Rodgers has appeared on ballot papers variously as "Richard Rodgers", "Rev Dick Rodgers" and "Dick Rodgers".

European Parliament elections

Local elections

References

External links
 

2004 establishments in the United Kingdom
Christian political parties in the United Kingdom
Political parties established in 2004